Trevor Anthony Matich (born October 9, 1961) is an American football analyst and former center in the National Football League from 1985 through 1996.

Early years
Matich grew up in Sacramento, California.  He did not become  starter on his high school football team until he was a senior.

College career
Matich played college football at Brigham Young University where he was a two-time all-conference offensive lineman in the Western Athletic Conference.  As a member of the Church of Jesus Christ of Latter-day Saints, he went on a mission to Torreón in Mexico after his second season at BYU.  After returning, he helped the team win the 1984 NCAA football championship as their starting center.  In his four seasons at BYU (1979-80 and 1983-84), the Cougars posted a combined 47-3 record; Matich snapped to four different All-American quarterbacks during that span: Marc Wilson, Jim McMahon, Steve Young, and Robbie Bosco.

Professional career
He was drafted by the New England Patriots in the first round of the 1985 NFL Draft. He injured his ankle in his first game as a rookie and missed the rest of the season.  After four seasons with the Patriots, he went on to play for the Detroit Lions, New York Jets, Indianapolis Colts and Washington Redskins.  In all, he played in the NFL for 12 seasons, mainly as a long snapper.  While playing for the Indianapolis Colts (1992–1993), he was nicknamed the "Hardest Working Man in Pro Football" due to his constant practicing and warming up on the sidelines.

Broadcasting career
After his playing career was over, Matich briefly served as a color analyst  for Fox Sports' NFL coverage and then at CBS for a year.  He has appeared as a Washington Redskins studio analyst for their pregame and postgame shows and has won eight Emmys for his work.  He currently is employed by ESPN, primarily working on ESPN's College Football coverage along with appearances on SportsCenter.

References

External links
Trevor Matich Official Website

1961 births
Living people
American football offensive linemen
American Latter Day Saints
American Mormon missionaries in Mexico
American people of Serbian descent
BYU Cougars football players
College football announcers
Detroit Lions players
ESPN people
Indianapolis Colts players
National Football League announcers
New England Patriots players
New York Jets players
Players of American football from Sacramento, California
Washington Redskins players